Humberto Valentino Robinson (June 25, 1930 – September 29, 2009) was a middle relief pitcher in Major League Baseball who played from 1955 through 1960 for the Milwaukee Braves (1955, 1958), Cleveland Indians (1959) and Philadelphia Phillies (1959–60). He was born in Colón, Panama. Robinson was the first Panamanian-born player to appear in a Major League game. He debuted with the Braves on April 20, 1955.

In an eight-season career, Robinson posted an 8–13 record with a 3.25 ERA and four saves in 102 appearances, including seven starts and two complete games, giving up 77 earned runs on 189 hits and 90 walks while striking out 114 in 213.0 innings of work. In 10 minor league seasons, Robinson compiled a record of 122–84 with a 3.05 ERA for nine different teams (1951–57, 1960–62). He also was a main force in the pitching staff of Panamanian teams during the first stage of the Caribbean Series.

Robinson died in Brooklyn, New York at the age of 79, due to complications from Alzheimer's disease.

Fact
Before debuting in the majors, Robinson set a South Atlantic League record with 23 wins in 1954. He is also notable for reporting a US$1500 offer to throw a game in 1959.

See also
List of Major League Baseball players from Panama

Notes

External links

Retrosheet

1930 births
2009 deaths
Buffalo Bisons (minor league) players
Cleveland Indians players
Deaths from Alzheimer's disease
Deaths from dementia in New York (state)
Evansville Braves players
Jacksonville Braves players
Major League Baseball pitchers
Major League Baseball players from Panama
Mexican League baseball pitchers
Milwaukee Braves players
Panamanian expatriate baseball players in Canada
Panamanian expatriate baseball players in Mexico
Panamanian expatriate baseball players in the United States
Sportspeople from Colón, Panama
Philadelphia Phillies players
Toledo Mud Hens players
Toronto Maple Leafs (International League) players
Wichita Braves players